Common clubtail may refer to:

 Gomphus vulgatissimus, a dragonfly found in streaming rivers and creeks in Europe
 Losaria coon, a swallowtail butterfly native to China and Indochina

Animal common name disambiguation pages